Golden Years is a 2017 French drama film directed by André Téchiné and starring Pierre Deladonchamps and  Céline Sallette. The script was written by Téchiné in collaboration with Cédric Anger adapting Fabrice Virgili and Daniele Voldman's nonfiction book La garconne et l'assassin (The Flapper and the Killer). The plot follows a French army deserter who disguised himself as a woman in order to dodge the authorities. It was shown in the Special Screening section at the 2017 Cannes Film Festival.

Plot
The film is based on the true story of a French deserter who went into hiding during World War I, disguising as a woman and female friend of his own wife.

Cast
 Pierre Deladonchamps as Paul Grappe / Suzanne
 Céline Sallette as Louise Grappe
 Grégoire Leprince-Ringuet as Charles de Lauzin
 Virginie Pradal as the grandmother
 Michel Fau as Samuel
 Mama Prassinos as Valentine
 Xavier Robic as the mutilated soldier

References

External links
 
 

2017 films
2017 drama films
French drama films
2010s French-language films
French LGBT-related films
Films about deserters
Films directed by André Téchiné
2010s French films